A homeland is a place where a cultural, national, or racial identity has formed. The definition can also mean simply one's country of birth. When used as a proper noun, the Homeland, as well as its equivalents in other languages, often has ethnic nationalist connotations. A homeland may also be referred to as a fatherland, a motherland, or a mother country, depending on the culture and language of the nationality in question.

Motherland 

Motherland refers to a mother country, i.e. the place in which somebody grew up or had lived for a long enough period that somebody has formed their own cultural identity, the place that one's ancestors lived for generations, or the place that somebody regards as home, or a Metropole in contrast to its colonies. People often refer to Mother Russia as a personification of the Russian nation. The Philippines is also considered as a motherland which is derived from the word "Inang Bayan" which means "Motherland". Within the British Empire, many natives in the colonies came to think of Britain as the mother country of one, large nation. India is often personified as Bharat Mata (Mother India). The French commonly refer to France as "la mère patrie"; Hispanic countries that were former Spanish colonies commonly referred to Spain as "la Madre Patria". Romans and the subjects of Rome saw Italy as the motherland (patria or terrarum parens) of the Roman Empire, in contrast to Roman provinces. Turks refer to Turkey as "ana vatan" (lit: mother homeland.)

Fatherland

Fatherland is the nation of one's "fathers", "forefathers" or ancestors. The word can also mean the country of nationality, the country in which somebody grew up, the country that somebody's ancestors lived in for generations, or the country that somebody regards as home, depending on how the individual uses it.

It can be viewed as a nationalist concept, in so far as it is evocative of emotions related to family ties and links them to national identity and patriotism. It can be compared to motherland and homeland, and some languages will use more than one of these terms. The national anthem of the Netherlands between 1815 and 1932, "Wien Neêrlands Bloed", makes extensive use of the parallel Dutch word, as does the current Dutch national anthem, Het Wilhelmus.

The Ancient Greek patris, fatherland, led to patrios, of our fathers and thence to the Latin patriota and Old French patriote, meaning compatriot; from these the English word patriotism is derived. The related Ancient Roman word Patria led to similar forms in modern Romance languages.

"Fatherland" was first encountered by the vast majority of citizens in countries that did not themselves use it during World War II, when it was featured in news reports associated with Nazi Germany. German government propaganda used its appeal to nationalism when making references to Germany and the state. It was used in Mein Kampf, and on a sign in a German concentration camp, also signed, Adolf Hitler.

The term fatherland (Vaterland) is used throughout German-speaking Europe, as well as in Dutch. National history is usually called vaderlandse geschiedenis in Dutch. Another use of the Dutch word is well known from the national anthem, "Het Wilhelmus".

In German, the word became more prominent in the 19th century. It appears in numerous patriotic songs and poems, such as Hoffmann's song Lied der Deutschen which became the national anthem in 1922. Because of the use of Vaterland in Nazi-German war propaganda, the term "Fatherland" in English has become associated with domestic British and American anti-Nazi propaganda during World War II. This is not the case in Germany itself, where the word remains used in the usual patriotic contexts.

Terms equating "Fatherland" in other Germanic languages:
 Afrikaans: Vaderland
 Danish: fædreland
 Dutch: vaderland (as in the national anthem Wilhelmus)
 West Frisian: heitelân
 German: Vaterland (as in the national anthem Das Lied der Deutschen)
 Icelandic: föðurland
 Norwegian: fedreland
 Scots: 
 Swedish: fäderneslandet (besides the more common fosterlandet)

A corresponding term is often used in Slavic languages, in:
 Russian otechestvo (отечество) or otchizna (отчизна)
 Polish ojczyzna in common language literally meaning "fatherland", ziemia ojców literally meaning "land of fathers", sometimes used in the phrase ziemia ojców naszych literally meaning "land of our fathers" (besides rarer name macierz "motherland")
 Ukrainian batʹkivshchyna (батьківщина) or vitchyzna (вітчизна).
 Czech otčina (although the normal Czech term for "homeland" is vlast)
 Serbo-Croatian otadžbina (отаџбина) meaning "fatherland", domovina (домовина) meaning "homeland", dedovina (дедовина) or djedovina meaning "grandfatherland" or "land of grandfathers"
 Bulgarian татковина (tatkovina) as well as otechestvo (Отечество)
 Macedonian татковина (tatkovina)

Other groups that refer to their native country as a "fatherland"
Groups with languages that refer to their native country as a "fatherland" include:
 the Arabs as  'arḍ al-'abā' ("land of the fathers")
 the Albanians as Atdhe
 the Austrians as Vaterland
 the Azerbaijanis as vətən (from Arabic)
 the Chechens as "Daimokh" 
 the Estonians as isamaa (as in the national anthem Mu isamaa, mu õnn ja rõõm)
 the Finns as isänmaa
 the French, as La patrie
 the Flemings as Vaderland
 the Georgians as Samshoblo (სამშობლო - "[land] of parents") or Mamuli (მამული)
 the Ancient Greeks as πατρίς patris
 the Greeks as πατρίδα 
 the Irish as Athartha
 the Kazakhs as atameken
 the Kyrgyz as ata meken
 the Latvians as tēvzeme
 the Liechtensteiners as Vaterland
 the Lithuanians as tėvynė
 the Nigerians as fatherland
 the Oromo as Biyya Abaa
 the Pakistanis as Vatan (madar-e-watan means motherland. Not fatherland)
 the Somali as Dhulka Abaa, land of the father
 the Swiss as Vaterland (as in the national anthem Swiss Psalm)
 the Thais as pituphum (ปิตุภูมิ), the word is adapted from Sanskrit

Romance languages 
In Romance languages, a common way to refer to one's home country is Patria/Pátria/Patrie which has the same connotation as Fatherland, that is, the nation of our parents/fathers (From the Latin, Pater, father). As patria has feminine gender, it is usually used in expressions related to one's mother, as in Italian la Madrepatria, Spanish la Madre Patria or Portuguese a Pátria Mãe (Mother Fatherland). Examples include:

 the Esperantists as patrio, patrolando or patrujo
 Aragonese, Asturian, Franco-Provençal, Galician, Italian, Spanish (in its many dialects): Patria
 Catalan: Pàtria
 Occitans: Patrìo
 French: Patrie
 Romanian: Patrie
 Portuguese: Pátria

Multiple references to parental forms 
 the Armenians, as Hayrenik (Հայրենիք), home. The national anthem Mer Hayrenik translates as Our Fatherland
the Azerbaijanis as Ana vətən (lit. mother homeland) or Ata ocağı (lit. father's hearth)
 the Bosniaks as Otadžbina (Отаџбина), although Domovina (Домовина) is sometimes used colloquially meaning homeland
 the Chinese as zǔguó (祖国 or 祖國 (traditional chinese), "land of ancestors"), zǔguómǔqīn (祖国母亲 or 祖國母親, "ancestral land, the mother") is frequently used.
 the Czechs as vlast, power or (rarely) otčina, fatherland
 the Hungarians as szülőföld (literally: "bearing land" or "parental land")
 the Indians as मातृभूमि literally meaning "motherland"
 the Kurds as warê bav û kalan meaning "land of the fathers and the grandfathers"
 the Japanese as sokoku (祖国, "land of ancestors")
 the Koreans as joguk (조국, Hanja: 祖國, "land of ancestors")
 French speakers: Patrie, although they also use la mère patrie, which includes the idea of motherland
 the Latvians as tēvija or tēvzeme (although dzimtene – roughly translated as "place that somebody grew up" – is more neutral and used more commonly nowadays)
 the Burmese as အမိမြေ (ami-myay) literally meaning "motherland"
 the Persians as Sarzamin e Pedari (Fatherland), Sarzamin e Mādari (Motherland) or Mihan (Home)
 the Poles as ojczyzna (ojczyzna is derived from ojciec, Polish for father, but ojczyzna itself and Polska are feminine, so it can also be translated as motherland), also an archaism macierz "mother" is rarely used
 the Russians, as Otechestvo (отечество) or Otchizna (отчизна), both words derived from отец, Russian for father. Otechestvo is neuter, otchizna is feminine.
 the Slovenes as očetnjava, although domovina (homeland) is more common.
 the Swedes as fäderneslandet, although fosterlandet is more common (meaning the land that fostered/raised a person)
 the Vietnamese as Tổ quốc (Chữ Nôm: 祖國, "land of ancestors")

Uses by country
 The Soviet Union created homelands for some minorities in the 1920s, including the Volga German ASSR and the Jewish Autonomous Oblast. In the case of the Volga German ASSR, these homelands were later abolished and their inhabitants deported to either Siberia or the Kazakh SSR.
 In the United States, the Department of Homeland Security was created soon after the 11 September 2001, terrorist attacks, as a means to centralize response to various threats. In a June 2002 column, Republican consultant and speechwriter Peggy Noonan expressed the hope that the Bush administration would change the name of the department, writing that, "The name Homeland Security grates on a lot of people, understandably. Homeland isn't really an American word, it's not something we used to say or say now".
 In the apartheid era in South Africa, the concept was given a different meaning. The white government had designated approximately 25% of its non-desert territory for black tribal settlement. Whites and other non-blacks were restricted from owning land or settling in those areas. After 1948 they were gradually granted an increasing level of "home-rule". From 1976 several of these regions were granted independence. Four of them were declared independent nations by South Africa, but were unrecognized as independent countries by any other nation besides each other and South Africa. The territories set aside for the African inhabitants were also known as bantustans.
 In Australia, the term refers to relatively small Aboriginal settlements (referred to also as "outstations") where people with close kinship ties share lands significant to them for cultural reasons. Many such homelands are found across Western Australia, the Northern Territory, and Queensland. The homeland movement gained momentum in the 1970 and 1980s. Not all homelands are permanently occupied owing to seasonal or cultural reasons. Much of their funding and support have been withdrawn since the 2000s. 
 In Turkish, the concept of "homeland", especially in the patriotic sense, is "ana vatan" (lit. mother homeland), while "baba ocağı" (lit. father's hearth) is used to refer to one's childhood home. (Note: The Turkish word "ocak" has the double meaning of january and fireplace, like the Spanish "hogar", which can mean "home" or "hearth".)

Land of one's home
In some languages, there are additional words that refer specifically to the place where one is home to, but is narrower in scope than one's nation, and often have some sort of nostalgic, fantastic, heritage connection, for example:
 In German language, .
 In Vietnamese language, .
 In Korean language, .

See also
 Diaspora politics
 Heimat
 Homeland security
 Mother tongue
 Separatism
 Secession

References

Further reading
 Landscape and Memory by Simon Schama (Random House, 1995)

External links
 Nationalism and Ethnicity – A Theoretical Overview

Nationalism
Cultural geography
Ethnicity in politics